Obsession is a 1954 French language motion picture crime drama directed by Jean Delannoy who co-wrote screenplay with  Antoine Blondin, Roland Laudenbach and Gian Luigi Rondi, based on story "Silent as the Grave" by Cornell Woolrich written under the pseudonym of William Irish. The film stars Michèle Morgan and Raf Vallone.

It tells the story of a couple forming a circus trapeze act, and their involvement in a murder case.

Cast
Michèle Morgan as Hélène Giovanni 
Raf Vallone as Aldo Giovanni 
Marthe Mercadier as Arlette Bernardin 
Jean Gaven as Alexandre Buisson 
Albert Duvaleix as Barnet 
Robert Dalban as Inspecteur Chardin 
Louis Seigner as L'avocat général 
Olivier Hussenot as Louis Bernardin 
Jacques Castelot as Me Ritter 
Jean Toulout as Le président des assises 
Dora Doll as L'entraîneuse 
Raphaël Patorni as Bertrand 
Martine Alexis as   Olga 
Albert Michel as Le réptionniste de l'hôtel rouennais 
Pierre Moncorbier as Le secrétaire de Chardin  
Aimée Fontenay as La chanteuse au trapèze 
Yves Rozec as Trapéziste

References

External links

Obsession at Films de France

1954 films
Films based on short fiction
Films directed by Jean Delannoy
French crime drama films
1954 crime drama films
Circus films
Films based on works by Cornell Woolrich
Films with screenplays by Roland Laudenbach
1950s French films